The ADG Lifetime Achievement Award is awarded to individuals who are outstanding in each of the guild's four crafts.

The guild's four crafts are, Art Directors; Scenic, Title and Graphic Artists; Illustrators and Matte Artists; and Set Designers and Model Makers.

Winners

See also 

 Art Directors Guild
 ADG Excellence in Production Design Award
 Art Directors Guild Hall of Fame

References 

Art Directors Guild Awards
American film awards
American television awards
Awards established in 1996
Lifetime achievement awards